Somerset Council is the unitary authority that will replace Somerset County Council and four 
district councils (Somerset West and Taunton, South Somerset, Mendip, and Sedgemoor) on 1 April 2023. The 110 councillors who will make up the new council were all elected to the county council in 2022, with a majority for the Liberal Democrat party.

History 

The Conservative governments of Theresa May and Boris Johnson undertook structural changes to local government in England that resulted in several county councils and their district councils being replaced by unitary authorities. Somerset County Council first made plans for unitarisation in 2018. The county council proposed a single unitary authority that would encompass all the districts, while the district councils proposed two unitary authorities representing the east and the west of the county. 

A non-binding referendum of Somerset residents held in June 2021 expressed a preference for the proposal for two unitary authorities. Robert Jenrick, the minister responsible, instead approved the plan for a single council in July 2021.

The council is due to assume full power on 1 April 2023. It will act as a shadow council following the first election to the new council, which took place on 5 May 2022, using the boundaries for the old county council but with double the number of councillors.

2022 election
On 5 May 2022, the Liberal Democrats won 61 of the 110 seats on the county council, giving them control of the unitary authority from 2023 when the county councillors transfer across.

See also

2019–2023 structural changes to local government in England

References

External links
Somerset Council

Unitary authority councils of England
Local authorities in Somerset
Organizations established in 2023
2023 establishments in England